Iso-Roine (also Iso Roinevesi) is  medium-sized lake in the Kokemäenjoki main catchment area in the Tavastia Proper region in Finland. The lake is located in the area of the city of Hämeenlinna. It is part of a chain of lakes that begins from the lakes Lummene and Vesijako at the drainage divide between the Kokemäenjoki and Kymijoki basins and flows westwards from there through the lakes Kuohijärvi and Kukkia into the Lake Iso-Roine, which in turn drains into lake Mallasvesi through the lakes Hauhonselkä and Ilmoilanselkä.

This lake is one of the deepest lakes in Finland, depth is more than 70 meters.

See also
List of lakes in Finland

References

Hämeenlinna
Kokemäenjoki basin
Landforms of Kanta-Häme
Lakes of Pälkäne